Asta may refer to:

Companies and organizations
 Aerospace Technologies of Australia
 American Sail Training Association
 American Scouting Traders Association, a former name of the International Scouting Collectors Association
 American Seed Trade Association
 American Society of Travel Advisors
 American Spice Trade Association
 American String Teachers Association, for music teachers
 Association for the Treatment of Sexual Abusers
 Association of Secondary Ticket Agents, a regulatory board in the United Kingdom
 Association of Short-Circuit Testing Authorities, a certification company acquired by Intertek in 2007
 AStA, German student representative organization
 Asta Film, a Danish film company
 ASTA Medica Onkologie, a pharmaceutical company acquired by Baxter International
 Australian School of the Arts

People
 Asta (musician) (born 1994), Australian singer/songwriter
 Ásta Árnadóttir (born 1983), Icelandic footballer 
 Ásta B. Gunnlaugsdóttir (born 1961), Icelandic footballer
 Asta Backman (1917–2010), Finnish actress
 Asta Ekenvall (1913–2001), Swedish historian, librarian and academic
 Asta Gröting (born 1961), German artist
 Asta Hansen (1914–1962), Danish actress
 Asta von Mallinckrodt-Haupt (1896–1960) German dermatologist
 Asta Mollerup (1881–1945), Danish dance teacher
 Asta Nielsen (1881–1972), Danish actress, star of German silent films
 Asta Nørregaard (1853–1933), Norwegian painter 
 Asta Põldmäe (born 1944), Estonian writer and translator
 Asta Philpot (born 1982), American advocate of sex lives for disabled people
 Asta Vihandi (1929–1993), Estonian opera singer and actress
 Antonino Asta (born 1970), Italian former football player
 Tony Asta, guitarist for Michigan heavy metal band Battlecross
 Flavio Asta (born 1946), Italian athlete

Places 
 Åsta, a village in Norway
 Loch of Asta, a lake near Tingwall in Scotland
 Asta (air base), a former Soviet Air Force base in Estonia

Other uses 
 1041 Asta, an asteroid
 Asta (moth), a synonym for the moth genus Avitta
 Asta (plant), a genus in the Brassicaceae family
 ASTA-BEAB, a conformance mark
 , a tugboat
 Asta, a fictional dog played by Skippy in the Thin Man films
 Asta (Black Clover), protagonist of the manga series Black Clover
 Cyclophosphamide, trade name: ASTA

See also 
 Astrid
 Andrea dell'Asta (1673–1721), Italian late-Baroque painter
 Astah*, a UML modeling tool
 Asti
 Asda (disambiguation)
 Hasta (disambiguation)

Danish feminine given names
Estonian feminine given names
Norwegian feminine given names
Scandinavian feminine given names
Swedish feminine given names